The Master (known previously in the United States as 3 Evil Masters) is a 1980 martial arts film produced in Hong Kong. It was directed by Lu Chin Ku and produced by the Shaw Brothers Studio. While The Master was Lu's attempt at kung fu comedy similar to Jackie Chan movies of the time, he continued on to create films with a more fantastical flair. 

In the story, the three antagonists, each with a certain fight gimmick, defeat Jin Tuan-Yun and take over his kung fu academy. A young student, Ko Han, nurses Jin back to health, and in return is taught a variety of secret martial art techniques in order to win back the school.

Cast
Chen Kuan Tai – Jin Tien-yun
Chiang Lin – Student
Wang Lung-wei – Yan Qing-wang
Eddy Ko – Ko Han
Lau Hok Nin – Shi Chen-chung
Yuen Tak – Gao Jian
Chan Lau – 2nd brother
Ai Fei – 1st brother
Wen Hsueh Erh – Shi's daughter

Legacy 
Underground rapper Afu-Ra, who regularly references kung fu pop culture in his music, has a song called "3 Evil Masters".

See also
Cinema of Hong Kong

References

External links
 

1980 films
Kung fu films
Hong Kong martial arts films
Shaw Brothers Studio films
1980s Hong Kong films